Longelo might refer to:

Emmanuel Longelo, English footballer
Rosaire Longelo, English footballer